State Route 323 (SR 323), also known as Pond Creek Road, is a short  east–west state highway in Loudon County, Tennessee. It serves as the primary access road from Interstate 75 (I-75) at exit 68 to the town of Philadelphia, at U.S. Route 11 (US 11).

Route description
SR 323 begins at an interchange with I-75 at exit 68. The highway then enters Philadelphia and crosses over Norfolk Southern's Knoxville District West End railroad line before coming to an end at an intersection with US 11 (Lee Highway and its unsigned designation of SR 2).

Major intersections

References

323
Transportation in Loudon County, Tennessee